Beta Pictoris (abbreviated β Pictoris or β Pic) is the second brightest star in the constellation Pictor. The Beta Pictoris system is very young, only 20 to 26 million years old, although it is already in the main sequence stage of its evolution. Beta Pictoris is the title member of the Beta Pictoris moving group, an association of young stars which share the same motion through space and have the same age.

The European Southern Observatory (ESO) has confirmed the presence of two planets, Beta Pictoris b, and Beta Pictoris c, through the use of direct imagery. Both planets are orbiting in the plane of the debris disk surrounding the star. Beta Pictoris c is currently the closest extrasolar planet to its star ever photographed: the observed separation is roughly the same as the distance between the asteroid belt and the Sun.

Beta Pictoris shows an excess of infrared emission compared to normal stars of its type, which is caused by large quantities of dust and gas (including carbon monoxide) near the star. Detailed observations reveal a large disk of dust and gas orbiting the star, which was the first debris disk to be imaged around another star. In addition to the presence of several planetesimal belts and cometary activity, there are indications that planets have formed within this disk and that the processes of planet formation may be ongoing. Material from the Beta Pictoris debris disk is thought to be the dominant source of interstellar meteoroids in the Solar System.

Location and visibility
Beta Pictoris is a star in the southern constellation of Pictor, the Easel, and is located to the west of the bright star Canopus. It traditionally marked the sounding line of the ship Argo Navis, before the constellation was split. The star has an apparent visual magnitude of 3.861, so is visible to the naked eye under good conditions, though light pollution may result in stars dimmer than magnitude 3 being too dim to see. It is the second brightest in its constellation, exceeded only by Alpha Pictoris, which has an apparent magnitude of 3.30.

The distance to Beta Pictoris and many other stars was measured by the Hipparcos satellite. This was done by measuring its trigonometric parallax: the slight displacement in its position observed as the Earth moves around the Sun. Beta Pictoris was found to exhibit a parallax of 51.87 milliarcseconds, a value which was later revised to 51.44 milliarcseconds when the data was reanalyzed taking systematic errors more carefully into account. The distance to Beta Pictoris is therefore 63.4 light years, with an uncertainty of 0.1 light years.

The Hipparcos satellite also measured the proper motion of Beta Pictoris: it is traveling eastwards at a rate of 4.65 milliarcseconds per year, and northwards at a rate of 83.10 milliarcseconds per year. Measurements of the Doppler shift of the star's spectrum reveals it is moving away from Earth at a rate of 20 km/s. Several other stars share the same motion through space as Beta Pictoris and likely formed from the same gas cloud at roughly the same time: these comprise the Beta Pictoris moving group.

Physical properties

Spectrum, luminosity and variability

Analysis of the spectrum reveals that the star contains a slightly higher ratio of heavy elements, which are termed metals in astronomy, to hydrogen than the Sun. This value is expressed as the quantity [M/H], the base-10 logarithm of the ratio of the star's metal fraction to that of the Sun. In the case of Beta Pictoris, the value of [M/H] is 0.05, which means that the star's metal fraction is 12% greater than that of the Sun.

Analysis of the spectrum can also reveal the surface gravity of the star. This is usually expressed as log g, the base-10 logarithm of the gravitational acceleration given in CGS units, in this case, cm/s². Beta Pictoris has log g=4.15, implying a surface gravity of 140 m/s², which is about half of the gravitational acceleration at the surface of the Sun (274 m/s²).

As an A-type main sequence star, Beta Pictoris is more luminous than the Sun: combining the apparent magnitude of 3.861 with the distance of 19.44 parsecs gives an absolute magnitude of 2.4, as compared to the Sun, which has an absolute magnitude of 4.83. This corresponds to a visual luminosity 9.2 times greater than that of the Sun. When the entire spectrum of radiation from Beta Pictoris and the Sun is taken into account, Beta Pictoris is found to be 8.7 times more luminous than the Sun.

Many main sequence stars of spectral type A fall into a region of the Hertzsprung–Russell diagram called the instability strip, which is occupied by pulsating variable stars. In 2003, photometric monitoring of the star revealed variations in brightness of around 1–2 millimagnitudes on frequencies between about 30 and 40 minutes. Radial velocity studies of Beta Pictoris also reveal variability: there are pulsations at two frequencies, one at 30.4 minutes and one at 36.9 minutes. As a result, the star is classified as a Delta Scuti variable.

Mass, radius and rotation
The mass of Beta Pictoris has been determined by using models of stellar evolution and fitting them to the star's observed properties. This method yields a stellar mass between 1.7 and 1.8 solar masses. The star's angular diameter has been measured using interferometry with the Very Large Telescope and was found to be 0.84 milliarcseconds. Combining this value with the distance of 63.4 light years gives a radius 1.8 times that of the Sun.

The rotational velocity of Beta Pictoris has been measured to be at least 130 km/s. Since this value is derived by measuring radial velocities, this is a lower limit on the true rotational velocity: the quantity measured is actually v sin(i), where i represents the inclination of the star's axis of rotation to the line-of-sight. If it is assumed that Beta Pictoris is viewed from Earth in its equatorial plane, a reasonable assumption since the circumstellar disk is seen edge-on, the rotation period can be calculated as approximately 16 hours, which is significantly shorter than that of the Sun (609.12 hours).

Age and formation

The presence of significant amounts of dust around the star implies a young age of the system and led to debate about whether it had joined the main sequence or was still a pre–main sequence star However, when the star's distance was measured by Hipparcos it was revealed that Beta Pictoris was located further away than previously thought and hence was more luminous than originally believed. Once the Hipparcos results were taken into account, it was found that Beta Pictoris was located close to the zero age main sequence and was not a pre–main sequence star after all. Analysis of Beta Pictoris and other stars within the Beta Pictoris moving group suggested that they are around 12 million years old. However more recent studies indicate that the age is roughly double this at 20 to 26 million years old.

Beta Pictoris may have been formed near the Scorpius–Centaurus association. The collapse of the gas cloud which resulted in the formation of Beta Pictoris may have been triggered by the shock wave from a supernova explosion: the star which went supernova may have been a former companion of HD 83058, which is now a runaway star. Tracing the path of HIP 46950 backwards suggests that it would have been in the vicinity of the Scorpius–Centaurus association about 13 million years ago.  However, HD 83058 has been found to be a spectroscopic binary and unlikely to have been ejected by the supernova explosion of a close companion, so the simple explanation for the origin of the Beta Pictoris cluster is in doubt.

Circumstellar environment

Debris disks

Excess infrared radiation from Beta Pictoris was detected by the IRAS spacecraft in 1983. Along with Vega, Fomalhaut and Epsilon Eridani, it was one of the first four stars from which such an excess was detected: these stars are called "Vega-like" after the first such star discovered. Since A-type stars like Beta Pictoris tend to radiate most of their energy at the blue end of the spectrum, this implied the presence of cool matter in orbit around the star, which would radiate at infrared wavelengths and produce the excess. This hypothesis was verified in 1984 when Beta Pictoris became the first star to have its circumstellar disk imaged optically. The IRAS data are (at the micron wavelengths): [12]=2.68, [25]=0.05, [60]=−2.74 and [100]=−3.41. The colour excesses are:  E12=0.69, E25=3.35, E60=6.17 and E100=6.90.

The debris disk around Beta Pictoris is seen edge-on by observers on Earth, and is orientated in a northeast-southwest direction. The disk is asymmetric: in the northeast direction it has been observed out to 1835 astronomical units from the star, while the southwest direction the extent is 1450 AU. The disk is rotating: the part to the northeast of the star is moving away from Earth, while the part to the southwest of the disc is moving towards Earth.

Several elliptical rings of material have been observed in the outer regions of the debris disk between 500 and 800 AU: these may have formed as a result of the system being disrupted by a passing star. Astrometric data from the Hipparcos mission reveal that the red giant star Beta Columbae passed within 2 light years of Beta Pictoris about 110,000 years ago, but a larger perturbation would have been caused by Zeta Doradus, which passed at a distance of 3 light years about 350,000 years ago. However computer simulations favor a lower encounter velocity than either of these two candidates, which suggest that the star responsible for the rings may have been a companion star of Beta Pictoris on an unstable orbit. The simulations suggest a perturbing star with a mass of 0.5 solar masses is likely to blame for the structures. Such a star would be a red dwarf of spectral type M0V.
 
In 2006, imaging of the system with the Hubble Space Telescope's Advanced Camera for Surveys revealed the presence of a secondary dust disk inclined at an angle of about 5° to the main disk and extending at least 130 AU from the star. The secondary disk is asymmetrical: the southwest extension is more curved and less inclined than the northeast. The imaging was not good enough to distinguish between the main and secondary disks within 80 AU of Beta Pictoris, however the northeast extension of the dust disk is predicted to intersect with the main disk at about 30 AU from the star. The secondary disk may be produced by a massive planet in an inclined orbit removing matter from the primary disk and causing it to move in an orbit aligned with the planet.

Studies made with the NASA Far Ultraviolet Spectroscopic Explorer have discovered that the disk around Beta Pictoris contains an extreme overabundance of carbon-rich gas. This helps stabilize the disk against radiation pressure which would otherwise blow the material away into interstellar space. Currently, there are two suggested explanations for the origin of the carbon overabundance. Beta Pictoris might be in the process of forming exotic carbon-rich planets, in contrast to the terrestrial planets in the Solar System, which are rich in oxygen instead of carbon. Alternatively it may be passing through an unknown phase that might also have occurred early in the development of the Solar System: in the Solar System there are carbon-rich meteorites known as enstatite chondrites, which may have formed in a carbon-rich environment. It has also been proposed that Jupiter may have formed around a carbon-rich core.

In 2011 the disk around Beta Pictoris became the first other planetary system to be photographed by an amateur astronomer. Rolf Olsen of New Zealand captured the disk with a 10-inch Newtonian reflector and a modified webcam.

Planetesimal belts
In 2003, imaging of the inner region of the Beta Pictoris system with the Keck II telescope revealed the presence of several features which are interpreted as being belts or rings of material. Belts at approximately 14, 28, 52 and 82 astronomical units from the star were detected, which alternate in inclination with respect to the main disk.

Observations in 2004 revealed the presence of an inner belt containing silicate material at a distance of 6.4 AU from the star. Silicate material was also detected at 16 and 30 AU from the star, with a lack of dust between 6.4 and 16 AU providing evidence that a massive planet may be orbiting in this region. Magnesium-rich olivine has also been detected, strikingly similar to that found in the Solar System comets and different from the olivine found in Solar System asteroids. Olivine crystals can only form closer than 10 AU from the star; therefore they have been transported to the belt after formation, probably by radial mixing.

Modeling of the dust disk at 100 AU from the star suggests the dust in this region may have been produced by a series of collisions initiated by the destruction of planetesimals with radii of about 180 kilometers. After the initial collision, the debris undergoes further collisions in a process called a collisional cascade. Similar processes have been inferred in the debris disks around Fomalhaut and AU Microscopii.

Falling evaporating bodies
The spectrum of Beta Pictoris shows strong short-term variability that was first noticed in the red-shifted part of various absorption lines, which was interpreted as being caused by material falling onto the star. The source of this material was suggested to be small comet-like objects on orbits which take them close to the star where they begin to evaporate, termed the "falling evaporating bodies" model. Transient blue-shifted absorption events were also detected, though less frequently: these may represent a second group of objects on a different set of orbits. Detailed modeling indicates the falling evaporating bodies are unlikely to be mainly icy like comets, but instead are probably composed of a mixed dust and ice core with a crust of refractory material. These objects may have been perturbed onto their star-grazing orbits by the gravitational influence of a planet in a mildly eccentric orbit around Beta Pictoris at a distance of roughly 10 AU from the star. Falling evaporating bodies may also be responsible for the presence of gas located high above the plane of the main debris disk. A study from 2019 reported transiting exocomets with TESS. The dips are asymmetric in nature and are consistent with models of evaporating comets crossing the disc of the star. The comets are in a highly eccentric orbit and are non-periodic.

Planetary system

 
On November 21, 2008, it was announced that infrared observations made in 2003 with the Very Large Telescope had revealed a candidate planetary companion to the star.
In the autumn of 2009 the planet was successfully observed on the other side of the parent star, confirming the existence of the planet itself and earlier observations. It is believed that in 15 years it will be possible to record the whole orbit of the planet.

The European Southern Observatory confirmed the presence of Beta Pictoris c, on 6 October 2020, through the use of direct imagery. Beta Pictoris c is orbiting in the plane of the debris disk surrounding the star. Beta Pictoris c is currently the closest extrasolar planet to its star ever photographed: the observed separation is roughly the same as the distance between the asteroid belt and the Sun.

The radial velocity method is not well suited to study A-type stars like Beta Pictoris. The very young age of the star makes the noise even worse. Current limits derived from this method are enough to rule out hot Jupiter-type planets more massive than 2 Jupiter masses at a distance of less than 0.05 AU from the star. For planets orbiting at 1 AU, planets with less than 9 Jupiter masses would have evaded detection. Therefore, to find planets in the Beta Pictoris system, astronomers look for the effects that the planet has on the circumstellar environment.

Multiple lines of evidence suggested the existence of a massive planet orbiting in the region around 10 AU from the star: the dust-free gap between the planetesimal belts at 6.4 AU and 16 AU suggest this region is being cleared out; a planet at this distance would explain the origin of the falling evaporating bodies, and the warps and inclined rings in the inner disk suggest a massive planet on an inclined orbit is disrupting the disk.

The observed planet by itself cannot explain the structure of the planetesimal belts at 30 AU and 52 AU from the star. These belts might be associated with smaller planets at 25 and 44 AU, with around 0.5 and 0.1 Jupiter masses respectively. Such a system of planets, if it exists, would be close to a 1:3:7 orbital resonance. It may also be that the rings in the outer disc at 500–800 AU are indirectly caused by the influence of these planets.

The object was observed at an angular distance of 411 milliarcseconds from Beta Pictoris, which corresponds to a distance in the plane of the sky of 8 AU. For comparison, the orbital radii of the planets Jupiter and Saturn are 5.2 AU and 9.5 AU respectively. The separation in the radial direction is unknown, so this is a lower limit on the true separation. Estimates of its mass depend on theoretical models of planetary evolution, and predict the object has about 8 Jupiter masses and is still cooling, with a temperature ranging from 1400 to 1600 K. These figures come with the caveat that the models have not yet been tested against real data in the likely ranges of mass and age for the planet.

The semimajor axis is 8–9 AU and its orbital period is 17–21 years. A "transit-like event" was observed in November 1981; this is consistent with those estimates. If this is confirmed as a true transit, the inferred radius of the transiting object is 2–4 Jupiter radii, which is larger than predicted by theoretical models. This may indicate that it is surrounded by a large ring system or a moon-forming disc.

Confirmation of a second planet in the Beta Pictoris system was announced on  6 October 2020. The planet has a temperature of T = 1250 ± 50 K, a dynamical mass of M = 8.89 ± 0.75 MJup, and an age of 18.5 ± 2.5 Myr. The orbit of Beta Pictoris c is moderately eccentric, with an eccentricity of 0.24.

This planet presents data with conflict with current, as of 2020, models for planetary formation. β Pic c is at an age where planetary formations is predicted to occur via disk instability. However the planet orbits at a distance of 2.7 AU, which prediction says is too close for disk instability to occur. The low apparent magnitude, of MK = 14.3 ± 0.1, suggests that it formed via core accretion.

Dust stream
In 2000, observations made with the Advanced Meteor Orbit Radar facility in New Zealand revealed the presence of a stream of particles coming from the direction of Beta Pictoris, which may be a dominant source of interstellar meteoroids in the Solar System. The particles in the Beta Pictoris dust stream are relatively large, with radii exceeding 20 micrometers, and their velocities suggest that they must have left the Beta Pictoris system at roughly 25 km/s. These particles may have been ejected from the Beta Pictoris debris disk as a result of the migration of gas giant planets within the disk and may be an indication that the Beta Pictoris system is forming an Oort cloud. Numerical modeling of dust ejection indicates radiation pressure may also be responsible and suggests that planets further than about 1 AU from the star cannot directly cause the dust stream.

See also
 51 Ophiuchi

Notes

References

External links

 The Circumstellar Disk Learning Site
 Beta Pictoris
 Dr. David Jewitt's page on Beta Pic
 Beta Pictoris at SolStation.
 ARICNS
 SEDS entry
 Notes for star Beta Pictoris

Pictoris, Beta
Pictor (constellation)
Pictoris, Beta
A-type main-sequence stars
Beta Pictoris moving group
Planetary systems with two confirmed planets
Articles containing video clips
0219
027321
039060
CD-51 01620
2020